Shankarrao Ramchandra Kharat (11 July 1921 – 9 April 2001) was a Marathi writer from Maharashtra, India.

Kharat was born in Atpadi, the secondary capital of the former princely state of Aundh, now in Sangli district. As an adult, he converted to Buddhism.

Kharat was associated with B. R. Ambedkar. He served for some years as the vice-chancellor of Marathwada University. and as a member of the Maharashtra Legislative Council.

In his writings, Kharat mainly wrote about the life experiences of people from the Dalit community.

References

External links
Shankarrao Kharat's literary legacy: Giving words to the Dalit experience in Maharashtra
Nalini Natarajan, Emmanuel Sampath Nelson, Handbook of Twentieth-century Literatures of India (1996), p. 368

2001 deaths
Writers from Maharashtra
Kharat, Shankar Ramchandra
1921 births
Indian Buddhists
People from Sangli
Members of the Maharashtra Legislative Council
Presidents of the Akhil Bharatiya Marathi Sahitya Sammelan
Dalit writers
Dr. Babasaheb Ambedkar Marathwada University